Arles Eduardo Flores Crespo (born April 12, 1991) is a Venezuelan footballer who plays for Venezuelan club Deportivo La Guaira as a midfielder.

Club career
Flores began his international career in 2012, on the Venezuelan Club Zamora. In 2016, he joined the club Deportivo La Guaira.

International career
Flores made his debut on the Venezuela national football team on February 3, 2016, in a FIFA World Cup qualifier.

References

1991 births
Living people
Venezuelan footballers
People from Barinas (state)

Association football midfielders
Venezuela international footballers
21st-century Venezuelan people